Clarence Bitters Platt (October 28, 1873 – August 25, 1941) was an American sport shooter. He was born in Camden, New Jersey. He won a gold medal in team clay pigeons at the 1924 Summer Olympics in Paris.

References

1873 births
1941 deaths
Sportspeople from Camden, New Jersey
American male sport shooters
Olympic gold medalists for the United States in shooting
Olympic medalists in shooting
Shooters at the 1924 Summer Olympics
Medalists at the 1924 Summer Olympics
19th-century American people
20th-century American people